Kumbewaha (Umbewaha) is an Austronesian language spoken on Buton Island off the southeast coast of Sulawesi in Indonesia.

References 

Muna–Buton languages
Languages of Sulawesi